Lars Jensen (born 4 July 1975) is a former Danish professional football defender. He ended his career in the Danish Superliga side AC Horsens.

Jensen previously played for Holstein Kiel and Jahn Regensburg in the German Regionalliga.

External links
Career statistics at Danmarks Radio

1975 births
Living people
Danish men's footballers
AC Horsens players
SSV Jahn Regensburg players
Holstein Kiel players
Danish Superliga players
Association football defenders